Jay's Grave (or Kitty Jay's Grave) is supposedly the last resting place of a suicide victim who is thought to have died in the late 18th century. It has become a well-known landmark on Dartmoor, Devon, in South-West England, and is the subject of local folklore, and several ghost stories.

The small burial mound is at the side of a minor road, about 1 mile (1.6 km) north west of Hound Tor, at the entrance to a green lane that leads to Natsworthy. Fresh flowers are regularly placed on the grave, although no-one admits to putting them there.

Folklore
Since it was first set down in the late 19th century, the story attached to the grave has changed and has been greatly embellished.

Early references
An early newspaper account of the discovery of the grave appears on page 5 of the North Devon Journal for 23 January 1851, under "County Intelligence":

In 1876 Robert Dymond edited and published a book entitled "Things Old and New" Concerning the Parish of Widecombe-in-the-Moor and its Neighbourhood which contains the following:

In Volume 1 of the Western Antiquary, dated October 1881, one F. B. Doveton asked for further details of a grave that he had noted by the side of the road to Hey Tor. Doveton's guide had told him that it 

In a reply to Doveton's enquiry that was published later the same month, P. F. S. Amery quoted the above passage from Dymond and added some extra information:

Twenty years later, in the first volume of Devon Notes and Queries (1900–01), W. H. Thornton, who identified himself as the rector of North Bovey, asked:

In reply to this enquiry P. F. S. Amery, who was by now one of the editors of Devon Notes and Queries, wrote:

In a map from 1905, the grave appears as Jane's Grave.

In 1909, William Crossing, in his Guide to Dartmoor repeated Amery's report, though he named the suicide as "Kitty Jay, as she used to be spoken of", and amended the location of the incident to "Canna, a farm not far from the foot of East Down".

The Dartmoor author Beatrice Chase wrote about the legend in her 1914 novel The Heart of the Moor, and claimed in a prefixed publisher's note that the events it describes are true. In the novel she says:

Because there is no inscription on the grave she sets out to discover whose it might be. After asking several locals and searching maps and guidebooks without success, she eventually finds that "Granny Caunter" knows the story:

Patricia Milton, writing in 2006, points out that Chase was being disingenuous in her novel, because as early as 1905 the grave was being mentioned in guidebooks, and coach drivers were already pointing it out to tourists.

Later versions
By 1965 Jay's Grave had become a major Dartmoor attraction, with tourist coaches stopping there while the driver/guide related their own version of the story. The mysterious appearance of fresh flowers upon the grave was always mentioned.

Recent versions of the legend include embellishments such as the orphaned baby being taken into the Poor House in Newton Abbot or Wolborough where she was given the name Mary Jay. She now sometimes acquires the name Kitty after being sent to Canna Farm as a teenage apprentice. In one version of the tale, she is raped by a local farmhand. In another version, she finds romance with the farmer's son. Either way, she becomes pregnant which results in her being thrown out of the farm and left with a reputation. Such is her shame and despair that she hangs herself in a barn, or perhaps from the great kitchen fireplace lintel, or else she drowns herself in a shallow pool.

It is now said that the three local parishes of Widecombe-in-the-Moor, North Bovey and Manaton all refused to bury her body within consecrated ground, so she was buried at a crossroads, which was standard practice for suicide victims at the time. It is also often said that this crossroads is at the point where the three parishes met, though the Ordnance Survey map confirms that this is not the case.

The grave
There are always fresh flowers on the grave, the placement of which is the subject of local folklore – some claim they are placed there by pixies, but it is known that the author Beatrice Chase was one person who did this, before her death in 1955. By 2007 the placing of flowers had expanded into all sorts of votive offerings: coins, candles, shells, small crosses and toys, for instance.

Motorists, passing at night, claim to have glimpsed ghostly figures in their headlights, others report seeing a dark, hooded figure kneeling there.

Notable uses of the story
Jay's Grave was the inspiration for John Galsworthy's short story The Apple Tree, written in 1916. In the 1970s, knowledge of the legend prompted Martin Turner of British rock band Wishbone Ash to write the lyrics to a song called "Lady Jay" which appears on the band's 1974 album There's the Rub. David Rudkin wrote an episode inspired by the tale entitled The Living Grave for the BBC 2 TV anthology series Leap in the Dark, broadcast in 1980. It also inspired Seth Lakeman to write his 2004 song and album, both called Kitty Jay.  Sir Arthur Conan Doyle visited the nearby house, Heatree, and he is said to have been inspired by the location of the house and its proximity to Jay's Grave, Bowerman's nose, Hound Tor and Grimspound to write The Hound of the Baskervilles.

References

Further reading

Dartmoor
Monuments and memorials in Devon
Devon folklore
Reportedly haunted locations in South West England